Chatman is a surname. Notable people with the surname include:

 John Chatman or Peter Chatman, the real name of the musician Memphis Slim (1915-1988)
 Antonio Chatman (born 1979), American football wide receiver and punt returner 
 Charles Chatman (born 1961), wrongfully convicted American
 Jesse Chatman (born 1979), American football running back
 Kebo Gotti (born 1985 as Dankivion Chatman), American rapper
 Mire Chatman (born 1978), American basketball player
 Pokey Chatman (born 1969), American, former head coach of the LSU Lady Tigers basketball team
 Seymour Chatman (born 1928), American literary and film critic
 Vernon Chatman (born ), American television producer, writer, voice actor, stand-up comedian, musician